Shtul is a rural locality (a selo) and the administrative centre of Shtulsky Selsoviet, Kurakhsky District, Republic of Dagestan, Russia. The population was 258 as of 2010. There are 3 streets.

Geography 
Kutul and Kurakh are the nearest rural localities.

Nationalities 
Lezgins live there.

References 

Rural localities in Kurakhsky District